Amleto is a masculine given name, the Italian form of the given name Hamlet. Notable people with the name include:

 Amleto Frignani (1932–1997), Italian footballer
 Amleto Giovanni Cicognani (1883–1973), Italian cardinal
 Amleto Monacelli (born 1961), Venezuelan bowler
 Amleto Vespa (c.1888–1940), Italian spy

Italian masculine given names